The St. Bernard Cathedral (also San Bernardo Cathedral) is the main Catholic church and seat of the Bishopric of San Bernardo, located to one side of the Plaza de Armas de San Bernardo, in the metropolitan area of Santiago, Chile.

The original cathedral was built in 1820 as the seat of the city's parish. It functioned in this way until 1987, when it was elevated to cathedral of the new Diocese of San Bernardo. The earthquakes it had to withstand and some structural defects led to the destruction of the church. A new one was built in its place, which was finally inaugurated on November 25, 2000, being consecrated by Cardinal Darío Castrillón Hoyos, Pontifical Legate for the celebration of the Great Jubilee of 2000 in Chile.

See also
Roman Catholicism in Chile
St. Bernard

References

Roman Catholic cathedrals in Chile
Roman Catholic churches completed in 2000
20th-century Roman Catholic church buildings in Chile
Modernist architecture in Chile